Northwestern Otomi is a Native American language of central Mexico.

Varieties
There are two varieties with limited (c. 78%) intelligibility, sometimes considered separate languages:
Mezquital Otomi (Otomí del Valle del Mezquital). The autonym is Hñahñu It is spoken in the state of Hidalgo, especially in the Mezquital Valley, by 100,000 people. There are also some migrant worker expatriates in the United States in the states of Texas (270), Oklahoma (230), and North Carolina (100). A dictionary and grammar of the language have been published.
Querétaro Otomi. The autonym varies as Hñohño, Ñañhų, Hñąñho, Ñǫthǫ. It is spoken by 33,000 in the Querétaro municipalities of Amealco (towns of San Ildefonso & Santiago Mexquititlán); in Mexico State, the town of Acambay, and in Querétaro, the town of Tolimán, and in Michoacan, the town of San Felipe los Alzatí. There are also small numbers in the state of Guanajuato.

Notes

Cited works
 
 

Otomi language